Martin Damm and Anders Järryd were the defending champions but lost in the quarterfinals to Peter Nyborg and Libor Pimek.

David Adams and Marius Barnard won in the final 6–3, 5–7, 7–6 against Hendrik Jan Davids and Cyril Suk.

Seeds
Champion seeds are indicated in bold text while text in italics indicates the round in which those seeds were eliminated.

 Jacco Eltingh /  Paul Haarhuis (first round)
 Yevgeny Kafelnikov /  Andrei Olhovskiy (first round)
 Menno Oosting /  Daniel Vacek (first round)
 Hendrik Jan Davids /  Cyril Suk (final)

Draw

References
 1996 ABN AMRO World Tennis Tournament Doubles Draw

1996 ABN AMRO World Tennis Tournament
1996 ATP Tour